James Lyon (July 1, 1735 – October 12, 1794) was an American composer of the colonial and Federal eras in New England.

Life 
James Lyon was born in Newark, New Jersey on July 1, 1735. It is known that his father was Zopher Lyon, but that he was orphaned at an early age. In 1750, Isaac Lyon and John Crane became James' guardians, until the age of twenty-one. Lyon then attended college at Nassau Hall, and afterwards obtained a master's degree from College of Philadelphia. Lyon became a Presbyterian minister, and left from Philadelphia for Nova Scotia, but he was unable to support his family, and subsequently accepted a job at the new settlement of Machias, Maine. After his first year there, the parish invited him to remain at a raised salary and he remained there with a few interruptions, until his death on October 12, 1794.

Music 
The first evidence of Lyon composing was during his college days at the commencement of 1759 at Nassau Hall, when President Samuel Davies delivered an oration, and where the ceremony concluded with an ODE, set to music by Lyon. In 1761, when a candidate for a master's degree at the College of Philadelphia, one of his works was performed on the same program as an Ode by Francis Hopkinson. While living in Philadelphia, Lyon produced his Urania, or A Choice Collection of Psalm-Tunes, Anthems and Hymns in 1761. This contained many English tunes as well as six original works by Lyon, including; Two Celebrated Verses by Sternhold and Hopkins an Anthem taken from the 150th Psalm and the 104th Psalm by Dr. Watts. Though many early historians stated that Urania was a failure, it was the first music collection compiled by an American composer and rather progressive and influential.

References

External links 
 https://archive.org/details/uraniaorchoiceco00lyon - An Online Copy of Urania, or A Choice Collection of Psalm-Tunes, Anthems and Hymns

Further reading 
 Alexander, Samuel Davies. Princeton College During the 18th Century. New York: A.D.F. Randolph and Company, 1872
 Edwards, George Thornton. Music and Musicians of Maine. Portland, Maine: The Southworth Press, 1928
 Sonneck, O.G. Francis Hopkinson and James Lyon. Washington, D.C.: H.L. McQueen, 1905.

1735 births
1794 deaths
18th-century American composers
18th-century American musicians
18th-century male musicians
American composers
American male composers
American Presbyterian ministers
Musicians from Newark, New Jersey
People from Machias, Maine
18th-century American clergy